Kingsley is a village in the East Hampshire district of Hampshire, England. It is 2.1 miles (3.4 km) north of Bordon, on the B3004 road. The village has a community centre and an inn, the Cricketers. The Victorian parish church of All Saints Is a Grade II listed building.

The parish includes Kingsley Common.

References

Further reading
 Annette Booth (ed. J. V. Bridge) St Nicholas, Kingsley: A brief history of one of Hampshire's oldest Village Churches Arrowhead Publishing, 1982 (available from the church)

External links
 Kingsley village website
 Stained Glass Windows at All Saints, Kingsley, Hampshire
 Stained Glass Windows at St. Nicholas, Kingsley, Hampshire

Villages in Hampshire